Sânpaul is a commune in Mureș County, Transylvania, Romania. It is composed of five villages: Chirileu (Kerelő), Dileu Nou (Magyardellő), Sânmărghita (Mezőszentmargita), Sânpaul, and Valea Izvoarelor (until 1960 Beșineu; Búzásbesenyő).

Gallery

See also
List of Hungarian exonyms (Mureș County)

References

Communes in Mureș County
Localities in Transylvania